Défi mini-putt (Mini-putt Challenge) was a weekly show in the early 1990s on the Quebec cable sports network, Réseau des sports.  It was the first professional miniature golf tournament to be regularly broadcast in Quebec.

Each course had exactly the same design, with some natural tweak, and every hole was a par 2.  The Mini-Putt franchise used a minimalist design, featuring only hills, bunkers, and a few obstacles.  This contrasts with the exotic, windmill-laden layouts of most miniature golf courses in the eastern United States and Canada.

Holes description 

The 18 holes of the "Mini" course usually played by the contestants were:

Le totem, with three twelve-inch tall wooden totem poles
La croix, a course in the shape of a cross
La courbe, a slightly inclined curve
La discothèque, a sideways T-shaped course
Le billard, a long rectangular course played by banking as in billiards
Le hockey, an elongated "L"-shaped course 
La rivière, a ramp to jump over a river
Le putter, a U-shaped course
Le chameau, with two steep hills
Les trappes, a ramp bordered by two traps
Le carrefour, a Y shaped course
Le slalom, with two off-centered gentle hills
Les laurentides, with three steep hills
Le zig-zag, a stretched Z-shape course
Le monstre, an irregular incline
La culotte, similar to Le putter
L'équerre, a curved metal bracket leading to the hole
Le plateau, a steep 2 feet high incline

In the 1990s, the Maxi course was also played occasionally on the show. Its 18 holes were:
Les cailloux, with two traps avoided by hitting a metal bar
L'escalier, a concrete staircase leading to the hole
La tablette, a square flat-topped step
Le recoin, a course similar to La courbe on the Mini course but including a trap
Les montagnes russes, a long course made of gentle hills
La cachette, a course where the hole is hidden in front of the player
La coulée, a U-shaped concrete ramp leading to the hole
Le triangle, a course where a metal triangle is hit to reach the hole
Le nez, resembling a nose seen sideways
L'Achaland, two gentle curves bordering traps
Les sentinelles, where the hole is guarded by two upright metal pipes
La soucoupe, with a circular depression leading to the hole
Le facile, with gentle hills leading to the hole
La fourche, a "Y" shaped course with a concrete step
Le super monstre, an irregular incline with a trap
Les collines, where the hole is guarded by three small hills
La porte, where the hole is reached by hitting an angular bracket
La pente douce, a shallow 2 feet high incline with a metal obstacle

A third course, the Midi, was designed but never constructed.

History

Golden age (1970–1988) 
The show appeared on TVSQ and was called L'Heure du Mini-Putt (Mini-Putt Hour). In 1989, Réseau des sports was born and the show was renewed up to 1998.

During this period, Mini-putt celebrities were very popular. Some of the stars of the show were Jocelyn Noël, who had great consistency in the regular season but sometimes struggled in the knockout tournaments (most notably in 1992 when he struck a totem pole on the first hole, aka "les totems" and was eliminated), as well as the legendary Carl Carmoni, seigneur des birdies et champion mondial du Québec best known for his mastery of the green and his Pepsi addiction, Sylvain Cazes and Gilles Buissières & wife Lucie, also Ron Poliseno, "Le Grand Requin Blanc".  Another famous "double" couple was Suzanne and husband André Buist. Later seasons of the show featured teams of two, as well as an upgrade to the Mini-Putt franchise's more difficult course, the "Maxi-Putt".

The biggest star of the show, however, was the very enthusiastic show announcer Serge Vleminckx.  His exuberant shouts of "Birdie!" for a hole in one, "la normale!" for two strokes, and "le bogey!" for three strokes, helped attract a cult following for the show.

Decline (2002) 

However, by the end of the 1990s, the Mini-Putt chain began to falter, and the owners refused to continue and pay for the show. In a meeting of the franchisers, when they decided to stop the TV show, Marcel Rocheleau, the owner of Mini-Putt Louiseville, said, "This will be the end and we will pick-up the bones."  Ron Poliseno, owner of Mini-Putt St-Eustache and Fabreville, along with 10 other owners, took a gamble and went back on TV for another two years. At that time there was still 51 franchises, but as of 2001, they found out that the TV was the reason of success. Then they started to fold up one by one. Today, three original Mini-Putt are still operating, but they all have to rely on a second product - ice cream, fast food, or a driving range.

Decline (2002- 2005)

Jocelyn Noel went on to participate in American miniature golf tournaments (PPA of Putt-Putt Golf), as well as Martin Ayotte, 4 times appearances. Serge Vleminckx went on to announce games for the short-lived Montreal Roadrunners roller hockey team. A lot of ancient players started to organize Mini-putt tournament during the summer where courses still exist.

Renaissance (2005-2020) 

Since 2005, a lot of new talents have emerged from the underground scene, which led to new tournaments organised by past champion Carl Carmoni and fellow enthusiasts, and the creation of the Mini-putt league of Sorel-Tracy. These efforts culminated in 2012 with the presentation of the Coupe Mini-Putt 2012, a webserie of 4 episodes that followed the former Défi Mini-Putt's format. Serge Vleminckx reprised his role and was assisted by Carl Carmoni and Jocelyn Noël as analysts. In May 2020, RDS broadcast this webserie resulting in great ratings.

Mini-Putt L'Authentique

The competition and tournaments are still alive, managed by Carl Carmoni and his group. Ron Poliseno owner of the Trade Marks Mini-Putt L'Authentique and Mini-Putt, has been approached by TV networks, to bring back the TV show and promote the series but the financing is still and always the problem.

Return to RDS (2021-Present) 

With a lot of hard work from Carl Carmoni and his wife Suzanne, a new 10-episode TV serie will be broadcast on RDS after the 2021 Olympics. This invitational type competition takes place at Mini-Putt Shawinigan-Sud on July 3 and 4, 2021.

Appelation 

Linguistically, the show prompted "mini-putt" to become the favoured Québécois term for miniature golf, while in the rest of Canada and the United States, the terms "miniature golf", "mini-golf", "crazy golf", and occasionally "putt-putt" are used interchangeably.

See also 
Miniature golf

References

Golf on television
1990s Canadian sports television series
Television shows filmed in Quebec
Miniature golf